Carlos Pedroso (born 28 January 1967) is a Cuban fencer. He won a bronze medal in the team épée event at the 2000 Summer Olympics.

References

External links
 

1967 births
Living people
Cuban male fencers
Olympic fencers of Cuba
Fencers at the 2000 Summer Olympics
Olympic bronze medalists for Cuba
Olympic medalists in fencing
Medalists at the 2000 Summer Olympics
Pan American Games medalists in fencing
Pan American Games gold medalists for Cuba
Universiade medalists in fencing
Fencers at the 1987 Pan American Games
Universiade bronze medalists for Cuba
Medalists at the 1987 Summer Universiade
Medalists at the 1989 Summer Universiade
Medalists at the 1987 Pan American Games
20th-century Cuban people
21st-century Cuban people